Diplomitoporus crustulinus is a species of fungus belonging to the family Polyporaceae.

It is native to Eurasia and Northern America.

References

Polyporaceae